Kawakatsu is a Japanese surname. People with this name include:

, current governor of Shizuoka Prefecture, Japan
, former football player
, Japanese zoologist
, former football player
Saburo Kawakatsu (born 1974) mixed martial artist

Japanese-language surnames